Valerie McDonald-Roberts is an American politician. She is  the Allegheny County Recorder of Deeds and was an unsuccessful candidate for Lieutenant Governor of Pennsylvania in 2006.

Community and political experiences
Roberts served on the Pittsburgh school board from 1989 to 1993, including one year as president. In 1994 she was elected to Pittsburgh City Council, becoming the first African-American woman to hold that position. During her time on council, she was President Pro-tempre and chairperson of the Financial and Budget Committee. Her main issues while serving on the City Council board included urban redevelopment, education, minority rights, and budgetary issues. In 2001, she was elected Allegheny County Recorder of Deeds. When the office was eliminated in 2008, Roberts was appointed the manager of county's Department of Real Estate.

Roberts has been a Girl Scout Leader for nearly twenty years, a member of her local St. Paul's Church in Point Breeze for most of her life, and a Sunday school teacher. She has also been a member of various local community organizations, including the Urban League of Pittsburgh, Carnegie Library and Science Center, and the Zoological Society of Pittsburgh.

Education
Roberts earned a B.S. in Medical Technology and an M.S. in Forsenic Chemistry, both from the University of Pittsburgh, both summa cum laude.

Campaign for Lieutenant Governor
On November 14, 2005, Roberts announced her candidacy for Lieutenant Governor of Pennsylvania. Her primary opponents included the incumbent Catherine Baker Knoll; William Hall III, a building contractor; and Gene Stilp, an anti-pay raise activist. Knoll had had the advantage of being endorsed by the State Democratic Committee, while few elected officials endorsed Roberts. Some progressive and liberal circles and groups, annoyed by Knoll's social conservatism, supported Roberts. Supporters of Ms. Roberts said she not only offered geographical, racial, and gender balance to a potential Rendell-Roberts ticket but had the ability and courage to bring about changes and reforms in Harrisburg. Her main campaign issues and themes were health care and education. Mrs. Roberts received endorsements from the Pittsburgh Post-Gazette, The Philadelphia Inquirer, The Daily and Sunday Review, Pittsburgh City Councilman Bill Peduto, Penn State Democrats, and Pennsylvania's two main pro-choice groups, Pennsylvania National Organization for Women and Pennsylvania Planned Parenthood.

On primary day, Roberts came in second to Knoll, with 139,585 votes to Knoll's 438,287.

Campaign for Allegheny County Controller
Roberts was a candidate for the 2011 Democratic nomination for the Allegheny County controller's office. Roberts lost the primary to Chelsa Wagner, who went on to win the office in the general election.

References

Year of birth missing (living people)
Living people
Women in Pennsylvania politics
University of Pittsburgh alumni
2008 United States presidential electors
Pennsylvania Democrats
21st-century American women politicians
21st-century American politicians